Iacopo Botto (born 22 September 1987) is an Italian male volleyball player. He is part of the Italy men's national volleyball team. On club level he plays for Volley Milano.

References

External links
Profile at FIVB.org

1987 births
Living people
Italian men's volleyball players
People from La Spezia
Sportspeople from the Province of La Spezia